21-87 is a 1963 Canadian abstract montage-collage film created by Arthur Lipsett that lasts 9 minutes and 33 seconds. The short, produced by the National Film Board of Canada, is a collage of snippets from discarded footage found by Lipsett in the editing room of the National Film Board (where he was employed as an animator), combined with his own black and white 16 mm footage which he shot on the streets of Montreal and New York City, among other locations.

Release and reception 
21-87 premiered on the CBC program Explorations in 1964.

Journalist Howard Junker dismisses 21-87 and Lipsett's other film, Free Fall, as repetitious: "the whole idea of wildly flashing stills and phrases wears quickly". Critic N. Roy Clifton is frustrated by the seeming randomness of the images. Critic John Fell suggests the film is evocative of parataxis, like a sentence without a conjunctive word.

Influence on George Lucas
"21-87" would have a profound influence on director George Lucas and on Walter Murch, an editor and designer with whom Lucas worked. Lucas described it as "the kind of movie I wanted to make – a very off the wall, abstract kind of film".

In response, Lucas created the pure cinema, short, 16mm movies: "6-18-67", "1:42.08", and "Look at Life". The later "Electronic Labyrinth: THX 1138 4EB", an experimental science fiction short, takes place in a dystopian future on 14 May 2187. Lucas expanded the latter into THX 1138. His later works American Graffiti and Star Wars has shown "21-87"'s influence. Lucas and Lipsett would never meet.

The concept of the Force, so prominent in Star Wars and its sequels and prequels, is said to have been inspired by a statement made by Roman Kroitor in the short film.

References in Lucas's works

In Star Wars, Princess Leia's prison cell on the Death Star is numbered 2187.
In Star Wars: Episode III – Revenge of the Sith, the order to initiate the Great Jedi Purge (Order 66) can be found by subtracting 21 from 87.
In the Star Wars sequel trilogy, FN-2187 is the designation of one of the main characters, who is later renamed Finn.

Awards
Ann Arbor Film Festival, Ann Arbor, Michigan: First Prize, 1964
Palo Alto Filmmakers' Festival, Palo Alto: Second Prize, 1964
Midwest Film Festival, University of Chicago, Chicago: Most Popular Film, 1964

References

Sources

External links 

 
 
 

1964 films
1960s English-language films
Canadian short documentary films
National Film Board of Canada short films
Canadian black-and-white films
Films directed by Arthur Lipsett
Collage film
Films produced by Tom Daly
Films produced by Colin Low (filmmaker)
1960s avant-garde and experimental films
1960s Canadian films
Canadian avant-garde and experimental short films